Shaban Rural District is in Qosabeh District of Meshgin Shahr County, Ardabil province, Iran. At the census of 2006, its population was 5,470 in 1,182 households, at which time the rural district was within the Central District. There were 4,372 inhabitants in 1,129 households at the following census of 2011, and in the most recent census of 2016, the population of the rural district (now in Qosabeh District), was 3,394 in 1,111 households. The largest of its 38 villages was Salman Kandi, with 409 people.

References 

Meshgin Shahr County

Rural Districts of Ardabil Province

Populated places in Ardabil Province

Populated places in Meshgin Shahr County